Ruslan Amirov (born 14 October 1990) is a Kyrgyz professional footballer of Tatar descent, who plays as a goalkeeper for Turanspor in Bölgesel Amatör Lig, where he plays with his older brother Ildar. He is a member of the Kyrgyzstan national football team.

International career
He is a member of the Kyrgyzstan national football team.

Career statistics

International

Statistics accurate as of match played 15 October 2013

References

External links

1990 births
Living people
Kyrgyzstani people of Tatar descent
Kyrgyzstan international footballers
Kyrgyzstani footballers
Kyrgyzstani expatriate footballers
Association football goalkeepers
Tatar sportspeople
Expatriate footballers in Turkey
Expatriate footballers in Kazakhstan
Expatriate footballers in the Maldives
Kyrgyzstani expatriate sportspeople in Turkey
Kyrgyzstani expatriate sportspeople in Kazakhstan
Kyrgyzstani expatriate sportspeople in the Maldives